The Battle of Southern Buh occurred near the banks of the eponymous river (today in Ukraine). The result was a great Bulgarian victory which forced the Magyars of the Etelköz realm to abandon the steppes of southern Ukraine, as well as their aspirations of subduing Danube Bulgaria, retreating to the newly occupied lands beyond the Carpathian Mountains, centering on Pannonia, from where they will stage their next war, against Moravians this time, defeating them and establishing a new Hungary, after the Etelköz state in modern Ukraine, which succeeded an earlier stage of statehood for the Magyars, the legendary although short-lived Levedia, and even one before that, in the actual country of origin for the Magyars, Yugra, beyond river Ob.

Origins of the conflict 

In 894 a war broke out between Bulgaria and Byzantium after the decision of Emperor Leo VI the Wise, to implement a request of his father-in-law, basileopater Stylianos Zaoutzes, to move the center of the Balkan trade activities from Constantinople to Thessaloniki, turned out inducing higher tariffs on Bulgarian trade. So Bulgaria's Tsar Simeon I defeats the Byzantines near Adrianople, before the year is over. But then the Byzantines turn to their standard method for handling such situations: they bribe a third party to assist, and on this case, they hire the Magyars of the Etelköz State to attack Danube Bulgaria from the northeast. The Magyars cross the Danube in 895, and are victorious over the Bulgars twice. So Simeon withdraws to Durostorum, which he successfully defends, while during 896 he finds some assistance for his side, persuading the usually Byzantine-friendly Pechenegs to help him out. Then, while the Pechenegs began to combat the Magyars on their eastern frontier, Simeon and his father Boris I, the former tsar who left his monastery retreat to assist his heir in the occasion, gather an enormous army and march to the north to defend their empire.

The battle 

Simeon ordered three days of fasting, saying that the soldiers should repent for their sins and seek help in God. When this was done, the battle began. It was long and unusually fierce but in the end the Bulgarians were victorious.

Aftermath 

The victory allowed Simeon to lead his troops to the south where he decisively defeated the Byzantines in the battle of Boulgarophygon. The war ended with a peace treaty which formally lasted until around Leo VI's death in 912, and under which Byzantium was obliged to pay Bulgaria an annual tribute in exchange for the return of allegedly 120,000 captured Byzantine soldiers and civilians. Under the treaty, the Byzantines also ceded an area between the Black Sea and Strandzha to the Bulgarian Empire, while the Bulgarians also promised not to invade Byzantine territory.

Footnotes

Sources

Sources
 
 
 
 
 
 
Йордан Андреев, Милчо Лалков, Българските ханове и царе, Велико Търново, 1996.

Battles involving the First Bulgarian Empire
Southern Buh
9th century in Bulgaria
9th century in Hungary
890s conflicts
896